Marc Casadó Torras (born 14 September 2003) is a Spanish professional footballer who plays as a defensive midfielder for Barcelona Atlètic.

Club career
Casadó is a youth product of CF Vilamajor, PB Sant Celoni, Granollers, and Damm. He moved to Barcelona's youth academy at the age of 13 in 2016. He was the captain of the Juvenil A team where he helped them win the league and Copa de Campeones in the 2020-21 season. He was on the bench for the reserve squad 5 times in 2021, and was promoted to the squad in the summer of 2022. On 5 July 2022, he extended his contract with the club until the summer of 2024.

He made his senior debut with Barça Atlètic in a 3–2 Primera Federación win over Castellón on 27 August 2022.

International career
Casadó is a youth international for Spain, having been called up to the Spain U16s and U17s in 2019.

Playing style
Casadó is a defensive midfielder primarily, but has also played as right-back and centre-back. He is hard-working and adept at recovering possession, and is a great ball handler. He is a tenacious and intense player on the pitch.

Career statistics

Club

References

External links
 
 
 

2003 births
Living people
People from Vallès Oriental
Spanish footballers
Spain youth international footballers
Association football midfielders
Primera Federación players
FC Barcelona Atlètic players
FC Barcelona players